Guy François may refer to:
 Guy François (painter) (1578–1650), French painter
 Guy François (colonel) (died 2006), colonel from Haiti
 Guy François (footballer) (1947–2019), football player from Haiti